Operation Lizard was the name given to a series of operations undertaken in Portuguese Timor by Australian troops in World War Two using Hoehn military folboats to get from the vessel to the island and return.

Lizard I, a party of four, were inserted on to the island on 17 July 1942 and evacuated by February 1943.
Lizard II, a party of four, landed on September 1942
Lizard III, a party enforced the original Lizard parties in November 1942
Portolizard - people who served with Lizard who stayed behind

References

Sources

 Hoehn, John. (2011). Commando Kayak: The role of the Australian Folboat in the Pacific Campaign. hirschbooks.net & ozatwar.com/hoehn. 

Lizard
Lizard